Robert Flock may refer to:

 Bob Flock (1918–1964), American stock car racer
 Robert Herman Flock (born 1956), American prelate of the Roman Catholic Church